Tom Neilson (22 October 1851 – 19 January 1909) was a Scottish international rugby union player. He played as a forward.

He played for West of Scotland, one of the top teams in Scotland at the time.

He was called up for the Glasgow District side for the 1874 provincial match against Edinburgh District on 5 December 1874.

He was called up to the Scotland squad in February 1874 and played England at The Oval on 23 February 1874.

His brother John Alexander Neilson also played rugby union for Glasgow District and Scotland.

References

1851 births
1909 deaths
Scottish rugby union players
Scotland international rugby union players
History of rugby union in Scotland
West of Scotland FC players
Glasgow District (rugby union) players
Rugby union players from North Lanarkshire
Rugby union forwards